Radhapuram is a legislative assembly constituency in Tirunelveli district in the Indian state of Tamil Nadu. The constituency is in existence since 1957 election. It is one of the 234 State Legislative Assembly Constituencies in Tamil Nadu in India.

Madras State assembly

Tamil Nadu assembly

Election results

2021

2016

2011

2006

2001

1996

1991

1989

1984

1980

1977

1971

1967

1962

1957

References 

 

Assembly constituencies of Tamil Nadu
Tirunelveli district